Erna Elisabeth Dorothea Sellmer (19 June 1905 – 13 May 1983) was a German film actress. She was best known in the English-speaking world for her role as housekeeper Frau Gerber in the 1970s Swiss-Canadian television series George about a St. Bernard dog and its owners.  In 1939 Sellmer provided the German language voiceover for Hattie McDaniel in her Academy award-winning role in Gone with the Wind.

Selected filmography
 Liberated Hands (1939)
 The Girl from Barnhelm (1940)
 The Great Love (1942)
 Two in a Big City (1942)
 The Bath in the Barn (1943)
 Port of Freedom (1944)
 I Need You (1944)
 Murderers Among Us (1946)
 Thank You, I'm Fine (1948)
 Insolent and in Love (1948)
 The Girl from the South Seas (1950)
 The Beautiful Galatea (1950)
 Corinna Schmidt (1951)
 Torreani (1951)
 Holiday From Myself (1952)
 Klettermaxe (1952)
 Fritz and Friederike (1952)  
 Captain Bay-Bay (1953)
 Secretly Still and Quiet (1953)
 Diary of a Married Woman (1953)
 Hooray, It's a Boy (1953)  
The Flower of Hawaii (1953)
 Spring Song (1954)
 My Children and I (1955)
 I'll See You at Lake Constance (1956)
 The Heart of St. Pauli (1957)
 The Big Chance (1957)
 Munchhausen in Africa (1958)
 My Ninety Nine Brides (1958)
 Thirteen Old Donkeys (1958)
 The Night Before the Premiere (1959)
 Stage Fright (1960)
 Life Begins at Eight (1962)
 Homesick for St. Pauli (1963)
 Charley's Uncle (1969)

References

External links
 

1905 births
1983 deaths
German film actresses
Actresses from Hamburg
German television actresses
German voice actresses
20th-century German actresses